The 2018 Mediterranean Games, officially known as the XVIII Mediterranean Games and commonly known as Tarragona 2018, was an international multi-sport event held from 22 June to 1 July 2018 in Tarragona, Catalonia, Spain. Tarragona was announced as the host city at the ICMG General Assembly in Mersin, Turkey, on 15 October 2011.

Bidding process 
The host city was announced during the ICMG General Assembly scheduled which took place in Mersin, Turkey (host of the 2013 Mediterranean Games) on 15 October 2011. The final candidates were Alexandria and Tarragona, where Tarragona won the vote 36–34.

 Alexandria, Egypt
Alexandria hosted the first Mediterranean Games and planned to build a new Olympic Village for the 2017 Mediterranean Games in the iconic South Mediterranean city.

 Tarragona, Spain
Under the motto "History making history", Tarragona planned to take the Games to Spain for the third time after the 1955 Mediterranean Games in Barcelona and the 2005 Mediterranean Games in Almería.

Development and preparation 

The International Committee of the Mediterranean Games (ICMG) announced in November 2016 that Tarragona was postponing its hosting of the Mediterranean Games from 2017 to 2018 due to funding problems caused by Spanish political and economical instability.

Some doubts were expressed in 2017 about the holding of the games due to the 2017 Spanish constitutional crisis after the Catalan government unilaterally declared independence on 27 October.

Marketing 
Tarracus, a humanoid character wearing a Roman helmet, was unveiled as the mascot for 2018 Mediterranean Games in May 2016. The pattern on the helmet plume is based on the flag of Tarragona.

The Games

Sports 
The 2018 Mediterranean Games sports program featured 28 sports encompassing 244 events. The number of events in each discipline is noted in parentheses. Triathlon was the only new sport added to the Mediterranean Games program. Equestrian and Golf came back after being absent in Mersin. Disabled events were held in swimming and athletics. Basketball tournament was held in the 3x3 format. Boxing and football were only men's events, while Rhythmic Gymnastics was women's only. The number in paratheses next to the sport is the number of medal events per sport.

Participating nations 
The 2018 Mediterranean Games were the first Games in which Kosovo was eligible to participate.

Calendar

Medal table 

Source: Medal Standings

Broadcasting

References

External links 

 
Mediterranean Games
Mediterranean Games
Mediterranean Games
Mediterranean Games
Mediterranean Games
Mediterranean Games
2018